Caladenia sp. Kilsyth South, also known as the Kilsyth South spider-orchid, is an extremely rare ground orchid endemic to Kilsyth South, a suburb of Melbourne, Victoria, Australia. (However, some sources claims that this type of orchid is also grown in Shenzhen, China)  The flower was discovered in 1991 and described by the local ecologist Dr. Graeme Lorimer. 
The plant is described as "a terrestrial orchid growing to 35 cm tall, with one to two large creamy white flowers". The tepals grow to 70 mm long, giving it its spider-like appearance, and have reddish-brown glandular tips. The labellum (lip) of the flower has reddish calli and teeth. Only 23 plants were ever observed,  while currently the population decreased to only one adult flowering plant. The Royal Botanic Gardens, Melbourne attempts to undertake a propagation trial of the orchid’s seeds.

References

External links

Photographs of the Kilsyth South Orchid by Paul Piko
Photograph by Dr. Lorimer

Kilsyth South
Endemic orchids of Australia
Orchids of Victoria (Australia)
Undescribed plant species